A leper colony, also known by many other names, is an isolated community for the quarantining and treatment of lepers, people suffering from leprosy. M. leprae, the bacterium responsible for leprosy, is believed to have spread from East Africa through the Middle East, Europe, and Asia by the 5th century before reaching the rest of the world more recently. Historically, leprosy was believed to be extremely contagious and divinely ordained, leading to enormous stigma against its sufferers. Other severe skin diseases were frequently conflated with leprosy and all such sufferers were kept away from the general public, although some religious orders provided medical care and treatment. Recent research has shown M. leprae has maintained a similarly virulent genome over at least the last thousand years, leaving it unclear which precise factors led to leprosy's near elimination in Europe by 1700. A growing number of cases following the first wave of European colonization, however, led to increased attention towards leprosy during the New Imperialism of the late 19th century. Following G.A. Hansen's discovery of the role of M. leprae in the disease, the First International Leprosy Conference held in Berlin in 1897 renewed interest and investment in the isolation of lepers throughout the European colonial empires. Although Western countries now generally treat cases of leprosy individually on an outpatient basis, traditional isolated colonies continue to exist in India, China, and some other countries.

Names
In medieval Latin, a place for the isolation and care of lepers was known as a leprosaria, leprosarium, or leprosorium, names which are sometimes used in English as well. Less common synonyms include leper asylum, leper lodge, and leper hospital. Other names derive from the figure of Lazarus in one of Jesus's parables, treated by the Catholic Church during the Middle Ages as a historical figure and as the patron saint of both lepers and the Crusader Order of Saint Lazarus, who administered the leper colony in Jerusalem before spreading to other locations. Maria di Nazareth, as lazarets, lazarettes, lazarettos, and lazarettas.

History

Although not all of the skin diseases (kushtha) discussed in the Indian Vedas and the Laws of Manu were leprosy, some of them seem to have been, with the disease appearing in the subcontinent by at least 2000. The Indian religious texts and laws did not organize formal leper colonies but treated those afflicted with the disease as untouchable outcastes, forbidding and punishing any marriage with them while they suffered from the disease, which was considered both contagious and a divine punishment for sins of the sufferer's current or former life. In legend, even kings were removed from power and left to wander in the forests while suffering from leprosy, although their position could be restored in the event of their recovery, whether through divine intervention or Ayurvedic herbal remedies such as chaulmoogra oil. Similarly, the ancient Persians and Hebrews considered certain skin diseases to render people unclean and unfit for society, without organizing any special locations for their care; it seems likely, however, that the references to "leprosy" in the Old and New Testments of the Bible are the result of a misunderstanding produced by the Septuagint's Greek translation and subsequent Latin translations like the Vulgate and originally referred to a variety of conditions such as psoriasis before becoming associated with leprosy centuries later. This confusion of termsand the related divine opprobriumwas then translated into Islamic medicine in the 9th century. The introduction of leprosy to southern Europe was blamed on the armies of Alexander and Pompey; ancient Greek and Roman doctors did not blame divine punishment and advocated various treatments but still usually advised that lepers be kept out of cities. Some early Christians sought to emulate Jesus's example by personally ministering to lepers or communities of lepers, activity recorded in hagiographies like StGregory's life of StBasil.

Leprosy seems to have reached the rest of Europe during late Antiquity and the early Middle Ages, with the imperial Church reducing formal restrictions on lepers while setting aside funds for leprosaria where clerics would treat the afflicted. Such leper houses are documented at St-Oyen in 460, Chalon-sur-Saône in 570, and Verdun in 634; their management was often provided by monastic orders. The area of modern Belgium alone may have had as many as 700 or 800 prior to the Crusades. Christian folklore misunderstood the parable of Lazarus and Dives as a historical account and took the sore-covered beggar in the story as StLazarus, patron of lepers; the military order StLazarus was established to care for lepers in Crusader Jerusalem and subsequently operated other leprosaria around Europe. Some colonies were located on mountains or in remote locations in order to ensure isolation, some on main roads, where donations would be made for their upkeep. Others were essentially hospitals within major cities. In 1623 the Congregation of the Mission, a  Catholic society of apostolic life founded by Vincent de Paul, was given possession of the Priory of St. Lazarus, a former leper house in Paris, due to which the entire Congregation gained the name of "Lazarites" or "Lazarists" although most of its members had nothing to do with caring for lepers.

Debate exists over the conditions found within historical colonies; while they are currently thought to have been grim and neglected places, there are some indications that life within a leper colony or house was no worse than the life of other, non-isolated individuals. There is even doubt that the current definition of leprosy can be retrospectively applied to the medieval condition. What was classified as leprosy then covers a wide range of skin conditions that would be classified as distinct afflictions today. Some leper colonies issued their own money or tokens, in the belief that allowing people affected by leprosy to handle regular money could spread the disease. Today leper hospitals exist throughout the world to treat those afflicted with leprosy, especially in Africa, Brazil, China and India.

Political aspects 

In 2001, government-run leper colonies in Japan came under judicial scrutiny, leading to the determination that the Japanese government had mistreated the patients, and the district court ordered Japan to pay compensation to former patients. In 2002, a formal inquiry into these colonies was set up, and in March 2005, the policy was strongly denounced.  "Japan's policy of absolute quarantine... did not have any scientific grounds." The inquiry denounced not only the government and the doctors who were involved with the policy, but also the court that repeatedly ruled in favor of the government when the policy was challenged, as well as the media, which failed to report the plight of the victims.

See also
 History of leprosy
 Kalawao, Hawaii
 Leper colony stigma
 Leper colony money
 Losheng Sanatorium
 Social distancing

References

 
History of medieval medicine
Leprosy
Leper hospitals